Ironton is an unincorporated community in Halbert Township, Martin County, in the U.S. state of Indiana.

History
Ironton was founded in 1873, and named for the presence of ironworks.

Geography

References

Unincorporated communities in Martin County, Indiana
Unincorporated communities in Indiana